Stoic may refer to:
 An adherent of Stoicism; one whose moral quality is associated with that school of philosophy
STOIC, a programming language
Stoic (film), a 2009 film by Uwe Boll
Stoic (mixtape), a 2012 mixtape by rapper T-Pain
The Stoic, a 1947 novel by Theodore Dreiser
, an S class submarine of the Royal Navy in World War II
Stoic Studio, an American video game developer

See also
Stoick the Vast, a fictional Viking character (chieftain and Haddock's father) in How To Train Your Dragon books and films